Es Sénia (formerly La Sénia) is a municipality in Oran Province, Algeria. It is the seat of Es Sénia District. It contains a university as well as the international airport of Oran Es Sénia.

Communes of Oran Province
Oran Province